The Herlev Hornets  were a Danish professional ice hockey team playing in the top Danish ice hockey league AL-Bank Ligaen. The team is located in the Copenhagen suburb of Herlev.

In 2011, the team returned to the top Danish league following a two-year hiatus due to financial problems. The team's new moniker is Eagles, having previously been known as Hornets. The team is coached by Finn Juha Riihijärvi. Following the team's return to the top flight in Danish hockey, former Herlev players and Danish national team players Kim Staal, Thor Dresler and Frederik Storm returned to play for the team.

Former players
 Mika Alatalo
 Nichlas Hardt
 Daniel Patrick Höhl
 Mikko Niemi
 Kai Nurminen
 Frederik Storm
 Martin Thelander
 Matthew Yeats

References

External links
 Official Site

Ice hockey teams in Denmark
Herlev Municipality